This is a list of shipwrecks located in Californian waters.

Del Norte County

Humboldt County

Los Angeles County

Marin County

Mendocino County

Orange County

San Diego County

San Francisco County

San Luis Obispo County

San Mateo County

Santa Barbara County

Santa Cruz County

Sonoma County

Ventura County

References

Further reading

California
Shipwrecks
 
Shipwrecks
Shipwrecks